Aurelio Biassoni (born 12 June 1912, date of death unknown) was an Italian professional football player.

1912 births
Year of death missing
Footballers from Milan
Italian footballers
Serie A players
Inter Milan players
F.C. Pavia players
Atalanta B.C. players
S.S.D. Sanremese Calcio players
U.S. 1913 Seregno Calcio players
Association football midfielders